John William Foss (February 13, 1933 – April 25, 2020) was a United States Army general, and commander of the United States Army Training and Doctrine Command.

Military career
Foss was born in Hutchinson, Minnesota on February 13, 1933. He began his military career when he enlisted in the Minnesota National Guard's 136th Infantry Regiment in April 1950. He transferred to active duty as an infantryman in 1951, received an appointment to the United States Military Academy, and was commissioned in the infantry in 1956.

Foss held a variety of command and staff positions. His overseas tours include four in Europe and four in Asia. Foss served as a platoon leader in the 504th and 187th Infantry Regiments in both Germany and Lebanon and commanded a rifle company in the 3rd Battalion, 32nd Infantry in Korea. He served two combat tours in Vietnam with the 4th Infantry Division as the Operations Officer, 2nd Brigade and as the commander of the 3rd Battalion, 12th Infantry.

Foss' commands include the 3d Brigade, 1st Cavalry Division; the United States Army Infantry School and Fort Benning; the 82nd Airborne Division; the XVIII Airborne Corps and Fort Bragg; and Commanding General, United States Army Training and Doctrine Command (TRADOC).

Foss also served as an instructor at the United States Military Academy; the first exchange instructor at the Royal Military Academy Sandhurst; the G-3 of III Corps; Chief of the Joint Military Advisory Group, Manila, Philippines; Commanding General, Seventh Army Training Command in Germany; the United States Army Chief of Infantry; and the Deputy Chief of Staff for Operations and Plans, Department of the Army.

In addition to a Bachelor of Science degree in Engineering, Foss received a Master of Science degree in Public Administration from Shippensburg State College. His awards include the Army Distinguished Service Medal with two Oak Leaf Clusters, the Air Force Distinguished Service Medal, Silver Star with Oak Leaf Cluster, Defense Superior Service Medal, Legion of Merit with Oak Leaf Cluster, and the Distinguished Flying Cross. He also earned the Ranger Tab, Expert Infantryman Badge, Combat Infantryman Badge, the Master Parachutist Badge with over 300 jumps, and the Army Staff Identification and Joint Chiefs of Staff Identification Badges. He was awarded parachute badges from the United Kingdom, Philippines, Honduras, and Egypt. Foss was inducted into the Ranger Hall of Fame in 1995.

Awards and decorations

Post military
Foss retired from the army on September 1, 1991 and lived in Williamsburg, Virginia. In retirement Foss had been Chairman of the Commission on the United States Army Reserve Command, served as a consultant to various defense industries, been on the Board of Advisors to both the Jewish Institute for National Security Affairs and the National Infantry Foundation, Senior Mentor to Senior Joint Warfighting Course, Armed Forces Staff College and was a Senior Fellow of the Institute of Land Warfare of the Association of the United States Army. In 1995 he was inducted to the US Army Ranger Hall of Fame. In September 2009, Foss was awarded the Doughboy Award by the National Infantry Association. In May 2013, Foss was selected and awarded as a Distinguished Graduate at West Point.

Personal
Last resided in Williamsburg, Virginia. His wife Gloria died of cancer June 26, 2014, and was interred at Arlington National Cemetery on August 12, 2014. He had three children, John W. Foss Jr., Kevin Mark Foss and Julia M. Foss Dunn. Through their daughter Julia, Foss has three grandchildren: Bryana, Kyla and Brady Dunn.

Foss died on April 25, 2020 at the age of 87. He was interred with his wife at Arlington National Cemetery on October 22, 2020.

References

External links
Jewish Institute for National Security Affairs bio
National Infantry Foundation bio
Ranger Hall of Fame Inductees
West Point Distinguished Graduate Recipients
Gloria Foss Obituary

1933 births
2020 deaths
People from Hutchinson, Minnesota
Military personnel from Minnesota
United States Army soldiers
United States Military Academy alumni
United States Army Rangers
United States Army personnel of the Vietnam War
Recipients of the Distinguished Flying Cross (United States)
Recipients of the Silver Star
Shippensburg University of Pennsylvania alumni
Academics of the Royal Military Academy Sandhurst
Recipients of the Legion of Merit
United States Army generals
Recipients of the Defense Superior Service Medal
Recipients of the Air Force Distinguished Service Medal
Recipients of the Distinguished Service Medal (US Army)
Burials at Arlington National Cemetery
United States Military Academy faculty